Rural school districts in Washington are administrative districts that provide educational services in rural areas of Washington state.

These are arbitrarily defined as school districts with enrollments of less than 1,000 students and no more than three schools. These rural districts typically serve a small town with a population of up to a few thousand. Some of these districts share educational facilities with neighboring districts.

Adna School District
The town of Adna in Lewis County is served by Adna School District No. 226. As of October 2006, the district has an enrollment of 596. This school district currently has two schools:

Adna Middle-High School
Adna Elementary School

References:
Adna School District No. 226
School district report card

Almira School District
The town of Almira in Lincoln County is served by Almira School District No. 17. As of October 2006, the district has an enrollment of 57. This school district currently has two schools:

 Almira/Coulee-Hartline High School — This school cooperates with the neighboring Coulee-Hartline School District.
 Almira Elementary School — Grades K-8. Students from who are part of the Coulee Hartline School district who live in Hartline attend the Almira K - 8 school until the 8th grade.

'Cooperative Status'
The districts have agreed to move the Almira/Coulee-Hartline High School to Coulee City by the 2008 school year.

References:
Almira School District No. 17
School District Report Card
Almira District Page
Town of Almira

Asotin-Anatone School District
The city of Asotin in Asotin County is served by Asotin-Anatone School District No. 420. In October 2006, the district has an enrollment of 578. This school district currently has two schools:

Asotin Junior-Senior High School
Asotin Elementary School

References:
Asotin-Anatone School District No. 420
School District Report Card

Benge School District
The town of Benge in Adams County is served by Benge School District No. 122. As of October 2004, the district has one school with an enrollment of 10 students:

 Benge Elementary School

References:
School District Report Card

Bickleton School District
The town of Bickleton in Klickitat County is served by Bickleton School District No. 203. As of October 2004, the district has one school an enrollment of 116 students:

In 1880 the people of Bickleton organized school district No. 210, and built a small box school house. Henry C. Hackley was the first instructor of the twelve pupils- Mrs. Osborne, a widow taught the second term. Mr. Bickle donated an acre of land at the east end of town for another school. The original public hall was converted to the grade school. It served the community until 1897 when it was removed to make room for present, two-story building. The contract was let for $1300. Eight grades were taught, seventy pupils in all, T.C. Anderson was the principal, Miss Jesse Forker was his assistant. On November 10, 1953, the Bickleton community constructed a new $107,645.12 brick school building. The building was built from May 15, 1952, to November 10, 1953. There were seventy-one grade school students attending this beautiful building and there were twenty-four high school students.

As of October 2004 Bickleton School District, which changed to school district No. 203 at some point, had an enrollment of 116 students. After recent developments and investments in both wind and landfill gas sustainable energy projects in the Bickleton area the School Superintendent, Rick Palmer, huddled for two years beginning in 2008 with the county assessor crunching numbers from wind energy developers before going to voters with an $8.9 million bond measure to build the new school. The old 1950s era schools not only lacked adequate HVAC (heating, ventilation and air conditioning) and septic systems but were also outdated as far as structural aspects and energy efficiency.

The School District contracted with Hill International Inc. in Spokane to perform both construction management services and building commissioning services. Mountain States Construction was awarded the contract as the general contractor and ground was broken in 2010 on the new $10.5 million, 42,000-square-foot school building to replace the old Bickleton School District's two 1950s-era schools. The new school building opened in the fall of 2011. As of 2012 the sprawling 500-square-mile rural school district still educates an average of 100 students each year.

Bickleton School

References:
Bickleton School District No. 203
School District Report Card

Boistfort School District
The town of Curtis in Lewis County is served by Boistfort School District No. 234. As of October 2004, the district has a single school with an enrollment of 102 students:

Boistfort Elementary School

References:
School District Report Card

Brewster School District
The town of Brewster in Okanogan County is served by Brewster School District No. 111. As of October 2004, the district has two schools with a combined enrollment of 969 students:

Brewster Jr/Sr High School
Brewster Elementary School

References:
Brewster School District No. 111
School District Report Card

Bridgeport School District

The town of Bridgeport, Washington, in Douglas County is served by Bridgeport School District 075. As of 2005 the school district had an enrollment of 748 students.

 Bridgeport Aurora High School is a small school facility with an enrollment of about 20 students in grades 9–12. 
 Bridgeport Middle School 
 Bridgeport Elementary

References:
Bridgeport School District No. 75
Bridgeport School District Report Card

Brinnon School District
The town of Brinnon in Jefferson County is served by Brinnon School District No. 46. As of October 2004, the district has a single school with an enrollment of 44 students:

Brinnon Elementary School

References:
School District Report Card

Cape Flattery School District
Cape Flattery School District 401 in Clallam county provides schools for the unincorporated community of Clallam Bay and the town of Neah Bay, located on the Makah Indian reservation. In 2004 the school district had a total enrollment of 493. This school district currently has three schools providing education for grades PK-12:

 Clallam Bay High & Elementary School
 Neah Bay High & Elementary School
 Cape Flattery Preschool

The district also supports the Clallam Bay Correction Center.

References:
 Cape Flattery School District #401
 GreatSchools report

Carbonado School District
The town of Carbonado in Pierce County is served by Carbonado School District No. 19. As of 2006 the district had a student enrollment of 180 students with 11.5 teachers and a single school:

 Carbonado Historic School 19 — Grades K-8.

References:
 Carbonado School District
 washington.schooltree.org
 Seattle PI GreatSchools.net

Centerville School District
The settlement of Centerville in Klickitat county is served by Centerville School District No. 215. As of 2006 the district had a single school with 77 students.

 Centerville Elementary School — Grades K–8

References:
 Centerville School District at SchoolTree.org.
 Centerville School District 215 at SchoolMatters.

Colfax School District
The town of Colfax in 
Whitman County
is served by Colfax School District No. 300.
The district has about 7-800 students and two schools.

 Colfax High School, Grades 9–12
 Leonard M Jennings, Grades K–8

References:
 DistrictBug.org

College Place School District
The town of College Place in Walla Walla County is served by College Place School District No. 250 The district has three schools and an enrollment of about 1550 students.

 John Sager Middle School, grades 6-8
 Davis Elementary School, grades K–5
 College Place High School, grade 9-12

References:
Local school directory

Colton School District
The town of Colton in Whitman County is served by Colton School District No. 306. The district has a single public school with 13 full-time teachers and about 210 students.

 Colton School, grades PK–12.

Guardian Angel/St. Boniface School is a Roman Catholic Private School in Colton. The school has 46 students in grades 1–8.

References:
 Local School Directory

Coulee-Hartline School District
The town of Coulee City in 
Grant County is served by Coulee-Hartline School District No. 151. In October 2004, the district has a combined enrollment of 215 and three schools. The school district shares a high school with the neighboring Almira School District.

 Almira/Coulee-Hartline High School
 Coulee City Middle School
 Coulee City Elementary School

References:
Coulee-Hartline School District No. 151
School District Report Card

Creston School District

The town of Creston in Lincoln County is served by Creston School District No. 73. As of May 2013 the total enrollment was 309, and the district has three schools, all co-located in the same building:

 Creston High School 
 Creston Middle School 
 Creston Elementary School

Damman School District
The Damman School District is located in Kittitas County. It has a single school:

 Damman School — This is a two-room school house that in Ellensburg that offers Kindergarten to grade 5.

References:
 Damman School District
 Damman Elementary School

Index School District
The town of Index in Snohomish County is served by Index School District No. 63. In October 2004, the district had an enrollment of 30 and a single school:

Index School

References:
School District Report Card

Lopez Island School District 
Lopez Island in San Juan County is served by Lopez Island School Districts No, 144. It has three schools.

Lopez Elementary School (K-8)
Lopez Middle/Senior High School (6-12)
Decatur School (K-8), one of a few "rural and necessary" schools in the state

References:

Lopez School District No. 144

Northport School District
The town of Northport in Stevens County is served by Northport School District No. 211. As of May 2013, the district has an enrollment of 291 students and two schools:

Northport High School
Northport Elementary School

References:
Northport School District No. 211
School District Report Card

Stehekin School District
The Stehekin School District No. 069 serves the village of Stehekin in rural Chelan County. The village is only accessible by boat, ferry, float plane, or by landing at Stehekin State Airfield. Students attend Stehekin School from Kindergarten through grade 8, at which point they continue their education in the Chelan School District, 50 miles down lake. As of May 2013, 13 students were enrolled.

 Stehekin School - a one-room school house serving the Stehekin Valley.

References
School District Report Card
History of the Stehekin School District
Ron Scutt, Teacher SSD- Milken Family Foundation Award Winner 1996

Onion Creek School District
The Onion Creek School District No. 30 in Stevens County was established in 1915 and offers classes from kindergarten to grade 8. In October 2004, the district has an enrollment of 44.

 Onion Creek School — The grounds of this school are notable for having one of the few remaining one-room schoolhouses and teacher cottages in Washington state.

References:
Onion Creek School District No. 30

Orient School District

The town of Orient in Ferry County is served by Orient School District No. 65. The district offers classes from kindergarten to grade 8. In October 2004, the district has an enrollment of 88 and a single school:

 Orient School — This school building is one of the oldest continuously used schoolhouses in Washington state. It was built in 1910.

References:
 Orient School District No. 65

Palisades School District
The village of Palisades in Douglas County Is served by Palisades School District #102. The district offers education for kindergarten to grade 5. The district is served by Palisades School, a two-room school house with portable buildings on site for additional classrooms. The District also owns the local Grange Hall for use during school functions. Students attend Eastmont School District after grade 5.

Wahkiakum School District
The town of Cathlamet in Wahkiakum County is served by Wahkiakum School District No. 200. As of 2005 the school district had an enrollment of 510 and three schools:

 Julius A. Wendt Elementary
 John C. Thomas Middle School
 Wahkiakum High School — grades 9–12

In 1999 the school board adopted a policy of "Suspicionless Urine Testing" for students. This policy was challenged in the courts by the ACLU.

References:
 greatschools.net
 OSPI
 ACLU of Washington State Challenges Suspicionless Urine Testing for Students

See also
 List of school districts in Washington

References